In cricket, a bowler taking five or more wickets in a single innings is known as a five-wicket haul or fifer, and is regarded as a notable achievement. Fewer than 40 bowlers have managed to take 15 or more in their international cricketing careers.  Chaminda Vaas, a former Sri Lankan cricketer and current fast bowling coach of the Sri Lankan team, has a total of 16 five-wicket hauls to his name, with twelve in Tests and four in One Day Internationals (ODIs). As a left-arm fast-medium bowler, he was accurate and particularly skilled in bowling both swing and reverse swing. Vaas often played a supporting role to Muttiah Muralitharan, Sri Lanka's off spinner and leading wicket taker. In the period from 1995 to their retirement from international cricket, the two bowlers accumulated 1,155 Test wickets and paved the way for many of Sri Lanka's victories.

Having made his Test debut in August 1994 against Pakistan,  Vaas took his first five-wicket haul seven months later in March 1995 against New Zealand. He repeated the feat in New Zealand's second innings, taking a total of 10 wickets and led Sri Lanka to their first ever overseas Test win.  His career-best bowling is the seven wickets he took against the West Indies for 71 runs in November 2001. He had taken another seven wickets in the first innings of the same match, bringing the total to 14 and making it the highest number of wickets he has taken in a single match.  It is also the second-best bowling performance by a Sri Lankan bowler after Muralitharan's 16 wickets for 220 runs in 1998. Vaas is ranked third among Sri Lankan bowlers by the number of Test five-wicket hauls, behind spinners Muralitharan and Rangana Herath.

Vaas made his ODI debut in February 1994 against India, but was unable to get a five-wicket haul for several years. His first was in October 2000 against the same team, when he took five wickets for 14 runs as he and Muralitharan led the Sri Lankans to the biggest ODI victory at the time. In December 2001, Vaas recorded the best bowling figures in ODI history, taking eight wickets for 19 runs against Zimbabwe. This is also the only occasion where a bowler managed to take eight wickets in an ODI innings. In addition, the six wickets he took for 25 runs against Bangladesh during the 2003 Cricket World Cup are the best figures recorded by a Sri Lankan bowler in a World Cup match.

Vaas played his last ODI in August 2008 and his last Test match in July 2009. He also played six Twenty20 International matches but did not manage to get a five-wicket haul in the format. His total of 16 five-wicket hauls is the second highest for a Sri Lankan bowler, after Muralitharan's 77. During his international career, Vaas took 355 Test wickets and 400 ODI wickets, making him the most successful fast bowler in Sri Lankan cricket history.

Key

Tests

One Day Internationals

Notes

References
General

Specific

External links
Player profile of Vaas at CricketArchive

Vaas
Vaas, Chaminda